Łukasz Wybieralski (born 27 April 1975 in Poznań) is a Polish former field hockey player who competed in the 2000 Summer Olympics.

He is brother of Krzysztof Wybieralski; son of Józef Wybieralski; nephew of Jerzy Wybieralski.

References

External links

 
 
 

1975 births
Living people
Polish male field hockey players
Olympic field hockey players of Poland
Field hockey players at the 2000 Summer Olympics
2002 Men's Hockey World Cup players
Sportspeople from Poznań